Ludwig Göransson is a Swedish composer, conductor and record producer who has received various accolades throughout his career.

He met American film director Ryan Coogler while studying at the USC School of Cinematic Arts and they subsequently became frequent collaborators, with Göransson providing the scores to all of his films, such as Fruitvale Station (2013), Creed (2015), Black Panther (2018) and its sequel Wakanda Forever (2022). For Black Panther, he won the Academy Award for Best Original Score, the Grammy Award for Best Score Soundtrack for Visual Media, and was nominated for the Golden Globe Award for Best Original Score. He received a second Academy Award nomination for Best Original Song thanks to "Lift Me Up", performed by Rihanna and written for the soundtrack of Wakanda Forever. In 2020, he worked with Christopher Nolan in the film Tenet, for which he received nominations for a Critics' Choice Movie Award and a second Golden Globe Award. He also composed the score for the television series The Mandalorian, part of the Star Wars franchise, which earned him two Primetime Emmy Awards for Outstanding Music Composition for a Series (Original Dramatic Score).

As a music producer, Göransson has frequently collaborated with Donald Glover also known under the stage name Childish Gambino. Overall, their work gathered six Grammy Award nominations, including an Album of the Year nomination for "Awaken, My Love!" and wins for Record of the Year and Song of the Year for the single "This Is America", the first rap song to win in these categories.

Awards and nominations

Notes

References

External links
  

Göransson, Ludwig